Edwin Hall (24 September 1895 – 9 July 1961), also known as Teddy Hall, was a British trade unionist.

Born at Hindley Green near Wigan, Hall began working at a colliery at the age of thirteen, joining the Lancashire and Cheshire Miners' Federation (LCMF).  A few years later, he became secretary of his local miners' lodge, and was later elected as a checkweighman, and as the union's agent for the St Helen's area.

In 1942, Hall was elected as vice-president of the LCMF, and as its president in 1944.  The following year, the union became the Lancashire Area of the National Union of Mineworkers, and Hall was elected as the area's general secretary.

Hall served on various national and international committees, and was a member of the General Council of the Trades Union Congress from 1954.  He was also secretary of the Leigh and District Trades Council.  Under union rules, he retired in 1960, on reaching the age of 65, and he died the following year.

References

1895 births
1961 deaths
Trade unionists from the Metropolitan Borough of Wigan
Members of the General Council of the Trades Union Congress